The Deal Timeball is a Victorian maritime Greenwich Mean Time signal located on the roof of a waterfront four-storey tower in the coastal town of Deal, in Kent, England. It was established in 1855 by the Astronomer Royal George Biddell Airy in collaboration with Charles V. Walker, superintendent of telegraphs for the South Eastern Railway Company. It was built by the Lambeth firm of engineers Maudslay and Field. The time ball, which, like the Greenwich time ball, fell at 1 pm precisely, and was triggered by an electric signal directly from the Royal Observatory.

Before it became a time ball tower, the tower was a semaphore tower used to signal to ships at anchor in the Downs or passing in the English Channel.

From 1821 to 1831, the Tower carried a semaphore mast, which was used by the Coast Blockade for the Suppression of Smuggling to pass information along the coast. The Blockade was under the auspices of the Navy, and was staffed by their personnel.

The Timeball Tower stands on the site of an earlier Shutter Telegraph. This was one of a chain of telegraph stations between the Admiralty in London and the Naval Yard at Deal. The telegraph line opened in 1796 and closed in 1814. Its purpose was to allow rapid communication between London and Deal, the latter being an important Naval anchorage during the Napoleonic Wars. In 1805 news of the naval victory at Trafalgar and the death of Nelson was brought to Deal by the schooner HMS Pickle (after calling at Falmouth), and transmitted by the telegraph to the Admiralty in London.

The Deal Timeball Tower Museum features exhibits about the history of the tower and its use for navigation aid, fight against smuggling, signaling, and the mechanics of the time ball.

See also
Shepherd Gate Clock
Time signal

References

Timeball Tower Museum
Information about the Deal Timeball Tower.

Navigational equipment
Museums in Dover District
Technology museums in the United Kingdom
Maritime museums in England
Time balls
Deal, Kent